Elections to East Ayrshire Council took place on 5 May 2022 on the same day as the 31 other Scottish local government elections. For the third consecutive election, the Scottish National Party (SNP) were returned as the largest party with 14 seats but remained shy of an overall majority. Labour gained back some of the ground they had lost at the previous election and were again returned as the second-largest party with 10 seats. The Conservatives lost one-third of their seats to return four councillors while The Rubbish Party retained their only seat. Three independent candidates were also elected.

The minority SNP administration retained control of the council with incumbent council leader Cllr Douglas Reid re-elected to the post unopposed. Former SNP Provost Jim Todd and Depute Provost Claire Leitch were also reinstated less than a year after being voted out of the roles.

Background

Previous election

At the previous election in 2017, the Scottish National Party (SNP) again won the most seats and governed with a minority administration. Overall, the SNP lost one seat to hold 14. Labour lost five seats but were still the second largest party with nine councillors and the Conservatives made a net gain of four to hold six seats. Two independents were elected – up one – and The Rubbish Party - standing in its first election - had their first councillor elected.

Source:

Electoral system
The election used the nine wards created under the Local Governance (Scotland) Act 2004, with 32 councillors being elected. Each ward elected either 3 or 4 members, using the STV electoral system where candidates are ranked in order of preference.

Composition
No by-elections were held following the previous election in 2017. The only changes in the political composition of the council came when Councillor Ian Grant was expelled from the Conservative group and became an independent in February 2022 and when Councillor John Bell resigned from the SNP in March 2022.

Retiring councillors

Source:

Candidates
The total number of candidates fell from 63 in 2017 to 54. As was the case five years previous, the SNP fielded the highest number of candidates at 17 (one less than in 2017) across the nine wards. Both Labour and the Conservatives also fielded at least one candidate in every ward but the 11 candidates fielded by Labour were two less than in 2017 whereas the Conservatives maintained a total of nine candidates. Unlike the previous election, the Libertarians did not contest every ward after only one candidate was selected. The Greens only fielded one candidate, down from four in 2017 while The Rubbish Party maintained their number of candidates at one. The Liberal Democrats contested an election in East Ayrshire for the first time since 2012 as they fielded two candidates. As was the case in 2017, nine independent candidates stood for election and the Alba Party contested an election in East Ayrshire for the first time.

Results

Source: 

Note: Votes are the sum of first preference votes across all council wards. The net gain/loss and percentage changes relate to the result of the previous Scottish local elections on 4 May 2017. This is because STV has an element of proportionality which is not present unless multiple seats are being elected. This may differ from other published sources showing gain/loss relative to seats held at the dissolution of Scotland's councils.

Ward summary

|- class="unsortable" align="centre"
!rowspan="2" align="left"|Ward
! %
!Cllrs
! %
!Cllrs
! %
!Cllrs
! %
!Cllrs
! %
!Cllrs
!rowspan=2|TotalCllrs
|- class="unsortable" align="center"
!colspan="2"|SNP
!colspan="2"|Labour
!colspan="2"|Conservative
!colspan="2"|Rubbish
!colspan="2"|Others
|-
|align="left"|Annick
|bgcolor="#efe146"|33.1
|bgcolor="#efe146"|1
|19.1
|1
|24.5
|1
|colspan="2" 
|23.2
|1
|4
|-
|align="left"|Kilmarnock North
|bgcolor="#efe146"|47.6
|bgcolor="#efe146"|2
|27.9
|1
|13.8
|0
|colspan="2" 
|10.7
|0
|3
|-
|align="left"|Kilmarnock West and Crosshouse
|bgcolor="#efe146"|38.4
|bgcolor="#efe146"|2
|28.2
|1
|22.0
|1
|colspan="2" 
|11.4
|0
|4
|-
|align="left"|Kilmarnock East and Hurlford
|37.2
|2
|bgcolor="#eea2ad"|38.5
|bgcolor="#eea2ad"|1
|12.1
|0
|colspan="2" 
|12.2
|1
|4
|-
|align="left"|Kilmarnock South
|bgcolor="#efe146"|53.3
|bgcolor="#efe146"|2
|31.4
|1
|12.2
|0
|colspan="2" 
|3.2
|0
|3
|-
|align="left"|Irvine Valley
|bgcolor="#efe146"|41.6
|bgcolor="#efe146"|1
|22.6
|1
|17.3
|0
|18.5
|1
|colspan="2" 
|3
|-
|align="left"|Ballochmyle
|bgcolor="#efe146"|39.7
|bgcolor="#efe146"|2
|32.7
|1
|16.8
|1
|colspan="2" 
|10.9
|0
|4
|-
|align="left"|Cumnock and New Cumnock
|33.9
|1
|bgcolor="#eea2ad"|41.2
|bgcolor="#eea2ad"|2
|18.5
|1
|colspan="2" 
|2.4
|0
|4
|-
|align="left"|Doon Valley
|20.8
|1
|23.1
|1
|16.7
|0
|colspan="2" 
|bgcolor="#c0c0c0"|39.4
|bgcolor="#c0c0c0"|1
|3
|- class="unsortable" class="sortbottom"
!align="left"| Total
!37.9
!14
!29.5
!10
!17.7
!4
!1.9
!1
!12.9
!3
!32
|}

Source:

Seats changing hands
Below is a list of seats which elected a different party or parties from 2017 in order to highlight the change in political composition of the council from the previous election. The list does not include defeated incumbents who resigned or defected from their party and subsequently failed re-election while the party held the seat.

Notes

Ward results

Annick
The SNP, the Conservatives, Labour and independent candidate Ellen Freel held the seats they won at the previous election.

Kilmarnock North
The SNP and Labour retained the seats they had won at the previous election while the Conservatives lost their only seat to the SNP. Independent candidate Ian Grant was elected as a Conservative candidate in 2017 but was later expelled from the party.

Kilmarnock West and Crosshouse
The SNP (2), Labour (1) and the Conservatives (1) retained the seats they had won at the previous election.

Kilmarnock East and Hurlford
The SNP (2) and Labour (1) retained the seats they won in the previous election while the Conservatives lost their only seat to independent candidate Graham Boyd.

Kilmarnock South
The SNP (2) and Labour (1) retained the seats they won at the previous election

Irvine Valley
The SNP, Labour and the Rubbish Party retained the seats they won at the previous election

Ballochmyle
The SNP (2), Labour (1) and the Conservatives (1) retained the seats they won at the previous election.

Cumnock and New Cumnock
Labour and the Conservatives retained the seats they won at the previous election while the SNP retained one seat and lost one seat to Labour.

Doon Valley
Independent candidate Drew Filson, Labour and the SNP held the seats they won at the previous election. Independent candidate John Bell was elected as an SNP candidate in 2017 but he later resigned from the party.

Aftermath
The SNP, who have run East Ayrshire Council since forming an administration as a result of the 2007 election, retained control of the council. It was reported that the party had been worried they would lose control of the council – as was the case in other councils across Scotland where unionist parties had voted together to prevent nationalist leadership – but the Labour and Conservative groups didn't oppose Cllr Douglas Reid's re-election as council leader. Provost Jim Todd and Depute Provost Claire Leitch were reinstated to their roles despite Labour and the Conservatives putting forward candidates for the roles however, the two parties did not support each other. The pair had been voted out in June 2021 when the opposition parties had voted together to have the leadership roles of the council shared more evenly across the council reflecting the fact the SNP administration was a minority administration.

Former Conservative group leader Tom Cook stood down at the 2022 election. He was replaced in the role by Annick councillor John McFadzean.

References

East Ayrshire Council elections
East Ayrshire